Laurent Ournac (born 26 April 1980) is a French actor and comedian.

Career 
In 2005, Ournac became famous for playing Laurent Fortin in the French version of the TV Show My Big Fat Obnoxious Fiance.

In 2013 he was one of the contestant during the Fourth season of Danse avec les stars. He finished on fifth place with his dancing partner Denitsa Ikonomova. Then he became the co-host of the show alongside Sandrine Quétier.

Filmography

Theater

Television

References

External links

 

Living people
1980 births
French male film actors
French male television actors
21st-century French male actors
People from Versailles